Criticism of Amnesty International includes claims of selection bias, as well as ideology and foreign policy bias against either non-Western countries or Western-supported countries. Governments that have criticised Amnesty International (AI) include those of Israel, the Democratic Republic of the Congo, China, Vietnam, Russia, Chile and the United States, which have complained about Amnesty International for what they assert constituted one-sided reporting, or a failure to treat threats to security as a mitigating factor. The actions of these governments—and of other governments critical of AI—have been the subject of human rights concerns voiced by Amnesty. The Catholic Church has also criticized Amnesty for its stance on abortion, particularly in Catholic-majority countries.

Amnesty has been criticized for paying some of its staff high salaries. An investigation on workplace environment was commissioned by Amnesty International from KonTerra and released in 2019, and indicated that a toxic work environment is present at the organization. Other investigations on institutional racism were commissioned by Amnesty International UK from HPO Global and released in 2022, which identified institutional racism present in the organization.

Amnesty's criticism by countries
Amnesty International has been criticized by many countries.

Allegations of pro-Western bias
This includes non-Western governments claiming Amnesty is ideologically biased against them, such as those of the Democratic Republic of the Congo, the People's Republic of China, Vietnam, and Russia who have criticized Amnesty International for what they assert constituted one-sided reporting or a failure to treat threats to security as a mitigating factor. The actions of these governments—and of other governments critical of Amnesty International—have been the subject of human rights concerns voiced by Amnesty.

Cricket ball campaign against Sri Lanka at the Cricket World Cup 2007

Amnesty launched its "Sri Lanka, Play by the Rules" campaign, timed to coincide with the 2007 Cricket World Cup held in Sri Lanka, to focus on that country's alleged human rights violations. The Sri Lankan government protested to the International Cricket Council (ICC) and Amnesty, saying the timing might undermine the morale of the Sri Lanka cricket team, which was playing in round Super 8 of the tournament. The Sri Lankan government also accused Amnesty of indirectly supporting the Liberation Tigers of Tamil Eelam. The Foreign Ministry of Sri Lanka said they were assured by the ICC that all steps would be taken to prevent Amnesty from carrying out any campaign within the grounds targeting Sri Lanka or its players; however, the ICC later said it was determined to focus on the World Cup and nothing else.

Amnesty stressed that the campaign was not aimed at the Sri Lanka cricket team. According to an Amnesty spokesman, "The campaign called on both parties as well as other militant groups in Sri Lanka to take steps to prevent civilians caught between as violence intensifies." "The signed balls will be delivered to the government of Sri Lanka as well as the LTTE", Amnesty said in a statement. The Sunday Island, a prominent national newspaper in Sri Lanka, criticised Amnesty's response: ...when the campaign is directed at 'Sri Lanka', the focus is clearly on the country and its legitimate government rather than on the terrorists. When such a campaign is conducted during a sporting event in which the targeted country is also participating, it constitutes a form of punishment, whereby the spectators are told that the participant country is doing something bad. When that happens, they may adopt a wholly different attitude towards the Sri Lankan cricket team even though it is not the cricket team that is [accused of] carrying out abductions and causing disappearances or waging war.

The Sri Lankan government criticized Amnesty for selectively targeting Sri Lanka while not targeting other nations accused of human rights violations at the same sporting event, or in similar major sporting events. "One would like to ask Amnesty International whether it plans to take up the issue of human rights violations by the US government in Iraq or in Guantanamo Bay detention camp at the Super Bowl match or the National Basketball League championship," the director of the Sri Lankan president's Media Division said.

Allegations of anti-Western bias

United States
In 2005, Amnesty International claimed that the United States was a human rights offender. The White House rejected these allegations, stating that they were unsupported by facts.

Russian dissident Pavel Litvinov has said of AI's criticism of the US: "[B]y using hyperbole and muddling the difference between repressive regimes and the imperfections of democracy, Amnesty's spokesmen put its authority at risk. U.S. human rights violations seem almost trifling in comparison with those committed by Cuba, North Korea, Pakistan or Saudi Arabia."

Guantánamo Bay comments 

In the foreword to Amnesty International's Report 2005, the Secretary General, Irene Khan, referred to the Guantánamo Bay prison as "the gulag of our times, entrenching the practice of arbitrary and indefinite detention in violation of international law. Trials by military commissions have made a mockery of justice and due process." In the subsequent press conference, she added "If Guantanamo evokes images of Soviet repression, 'ghost detainees' – or the incommunicado detention of unregistered detainees – bring back the practice of 'disappearances' so popular with Latin American dictators in the past. According to US official sources there could be over 100 ghost detainees held by the US. In 2004, thousands of people were held by the US in Iraq, hundreds in Afghanistan, and undisclosed numbers in undisclosed locations. AI is calling on the US Administration to close Guantanamo and disclose the rest".

Former U.S. Secretary of Defense Donald Rumsfeld believed the comments were "reprehensible", Vice President Dick Cheney said he was "offended", and President Bush said he believed the report was "absurd". The Washington Post editorialized that "lately the organization has tended to save its most vitriolic condemnations not for the world's dictators but for the United States." The human rights organization Human Rights Watch also criticized the Bush administration over the camp in its 2003 world report, stating: "Washington has ignored human rights standards in its own treatment of terrorism suspects."

Edmund McWilliams, a retired senior US Foreign Service Officer who monitored Soviet and Vietnamese abuse of prisoners in their "gulags", defended Amnesty International's comparison. "I note that abuses that I reported on in those inhumane systems parallel abuses reported in Guantanamo, at the Bagram air base in Afghanistan and at the Abu Ghraib prison: prisoners suspended from the ceiling and beaten to death; widespread 'waterboarding'; prisoners 'disappeared' to preclude monitoring by the International Committee of the Red Cross — and all with almost no senior-level accountability."

Pavel Litvinov, human rights activist and former Soviet-era "gulag" prisoner, criticized the analogy saying, "By any standard, Guantanamo and similar American-run prisons elsewhere do not resemble, in their conditions of detention or their scale, the concentration camp system that was at the core of a totalitarian communist system."

John Podhoretz writing in the New York Post on the difference between Guantanamo and a Soviet gulag said, "Maybe the people who work at Amnesty International really do think that the imprisonment of 600 certain or suspected terrorists is tantamount to the imprisonment of 25 million slaves. The case of Amnesty International proves that well-meaning people can make morality their life's work and still be little more than moral idiots."

William F. Schulz, executive director of Amnesty International USA, defended the statement, saying, "What is 'absurd' is President Bush's attempt to deny the deliberate policies of his administration." and "What is 'absurd' and indeed outrageous is the Bush administration's failure to undertake a full independent investigation." Secretary General Irene Khan also responded saying, "The administration's response has been that our report is absurd, that our allegations have no basis, and our answer is very simple: if that is so, open up these detention centres, allow us and others to visit them."

Since the U.S. administration originally claimed that these prisoners were not entitled to the protections of the Geneva Conventions, the U.S. Supreme Court has ruled against this interpretation (on 29 June 2006). Following this, on 7 July 2006, the Department of Defense issued an internal memo stating that prisoners will in the future be entitled to protection under the Geneva Conventions.

In 2010, Gita Sahgal, an Amnesty senior official, publicly condemned the organization for its collaboration with former Guantanamo detainee Moazzam Begg of Cageprisoners. In a letter to Amnesty's leadership, she wrote: "To be appearing on platforms with Britain's most famous supporter of the Taliban, whom we treat as a human rights defender, is a gross error of judgment." She warned that it "constitutes a threat to human rights". Begg has toured Europe with Amnesty officials. In 2010, Claudio Cordone asserted that Begg's views on holding talks with the Taliban or the role of jihad in self-defence were not antithetical to human rights, even though he may disagree with them. Cordone's assertion was criticized by Amrita Chhachhi, Sara Hossain, and Sunila Abeysekera who said that "defensive jihad" or "defence of religion" is often used as an excuse to violate human rights by Muslim, Christian and Hindu extremists.

Amnesty International's abortion policies
In April 2007, Amnesty International changed its neutral stance on abortion to supporting access to abortion in cases of rape and incest, and when the life or the health of the mother might be threatened. Amnesty's official policy is that they "do not promote abortion as a universal right" but "support the decriminalisation of abortion". According to deputy secretary general Kate Gilmore, the debate over the change was difficult, but eventually the overwhelming majority of national Amnesty chapters supported the change. The change was opposed by several organizations, notably by senior figures in the Catholic Church, traditionally a strong supporter of Amnesty International, and a group of US legislators. Amnesty spokeswoman Suzanne Trimel estimated that a "handful, probably less than 200" of over 400,000 members had quit over the issue.

The Catholic Church's Pontifical Council for Justice and Peace in June 2007 issued a statement urging Catholics not to donate to Amnesty because of its abortion stance. Cardinal Renato Martino said that abortion was murder, as was "to justify it selectively, in the event of rape, that is to define an innocent child in the belly of its mother as an enemy, as 'something one can destroy'". In an interview with the National Catholic Register, the Cardinal said he believed that "if in fact Amnesty International persists in this course of action, individuals and Catholic organizations must withdraw their support, because, in deciding to promote abortion rights, AI has betrayed its mission." The Church withdrew funding globally for Amnesty, and churches in various locations took other steps to sever their ties with the group.

the Vatican has levied criticism on Amnesty International for its supports of women's access to abortion services.

Decriminalisation of sex work 
In June 2013, confusion arose when a local chapter of Amnesty UK called Paisley Branch endorsed a Scottish bill that sought to criminalise sex work. Amnesty UK had its name removed from the list of supporters of the bill, stating that it ran contrary to its international policy not to criminalise 'the sex worker herself or himself' nor 'consensual sex between adults', and 'no conflating trafficking and sex work'. The issue forced Amnesty International to clarify its position on the legal status of sex work. A summary of an Amnesty International UK meeting held in 2013 revealed the intention to support the decriminalisation of sex work before any consultation with Amnesty members or stakeholders. When a draft copy of the policy was leaked in early 2014, several abolitionist feminists and former sex workers condemned the proposal. Members were consequently offered three weeks – from 2–21 April 2014 to provide feedback on the document, although most members did not even receive notification that this process was available to them.

On 7 July 2015 an updated draft was released to Amnesty International members. The New York Times reported that, although 'some complain[ed] that it was conceived at Amnesty's headquarters in London', 'various versions have been reviewed by the organization's national chapters, and a consensus emerged supporting decriminalization for just the prostitutes, according to minutes of organizational meetings.' The July 2015 draft policy was the result of two years of research and consultations with its members, and proposed to decriminalise both sellers and buyers of sex; it was scheduled to be put to a vote by about 500 Amnesty delegates from more than 80 countries at an Amnesty International conference in Dublin in August 2015. The proposal was criticised by abolitionist feminist organisations, including The Coalition Against Trafficking of Women (CATW), who published an open letter signed by over 400 advocates and organisations, condemning "Amnesty's proposal to adopt a policy that calls for the decriminalization of pimps, brothel owners and buyers of sex – the pillars of a $99 billion global sex industry". Contrary to claims that decriminalisation would make prostituted people safer, CATW pointed to research which alleged that deregulation of the sex industry had produced catastrophic results in several countries: "the German government, for example, which deregulated the industry of prostitution in 2002, has found that the sex industry was not made safer for women after the enactment of its law. Instead, the explosive growth of legal brothels in Germany has triggered an increase in sex trafficking." CATW instead asked Amnesty to support the so-called Nordic model, in which sex buyers and pimps are criminalized, while prostituted people are decriminalized.

In early August, a large number of NGOs published an open letter in support of the decriminalization proposal. The organizations supporting Amnesty International's position included the Global Network of Sex Work Projects (NSWP), the Committee on the Rights of Sex Workers in Europe (ICRSE), Sex Workers' Rights Advocacy Network in Central and Eastern Europe and Central Asia (SWAN), Human Rights Watch, and the Global Alliance Against Traffic in Women. On 11 August 2015, the International Council Meeting (ICM) voted in favour of a resolution which authorised the International Board to develop and adopt the decriminalisation policy. The New York Times described it as the result of 'days of emotional debates and intense lobbying', reporting that the abolitionist camp's lobbying was particularly 'aggressive', but a majority voted for the decriminalisation proposal as 'the best way to reduce risks for prostitutes' against 'arbitrary arrest and detention, extortion and harassment, and physical and sexual violence'. After the vote, a French abolitionist group announced it would no longer work with Amnesty in the future. In May 2016, Amnesty published its policy calling on governments around the world to decriminalise consensual sex work as the best way to improve the human rights of sex workers, and rejecting the 'Nordic model'; some abolitionist groups criticised the move.

Israel and allegations of antisemitism

The Israel Ministry of Foreign Affairs criticised the May 2012 report on administrative detention saying it was "one sided", and "not particularly serious", and "that it seemed little more than a public relations gimmick". Gerald Steinberg, of NGO Monitor, said that the report was tied to the recent Palestinian hunger strikes and that Amnesty "jumped on the bandwagon to help their Palestinian allies". Steinberg also said that one of the researchers, Deborah Hyams, was not a neutral party, saying that "Hyams has volunteered as a 'human shield' in Beit Jala (near Bethlehem) to deter Israeli military responses to gunfire and mortars targeting Jewish civilians in Jerusalem," and that in 2008 she signed a letter claiming Israel is "a state founded on terrorism, massacres and the dispossession of another people from their land".

The Israeli embassy in London called Amnesty "ridiculous". Amnesty said that this report "is not intended to address violations of detainees' rights by the Palestinian Authority, or the Hamas de facto administration. These violations have been and will continue to be addressed separately by the organisation".

In May 2012, NGO Monitor criticized Amnesty's 2012 World Report in a few areas:
 Amnesty criticized Israel's blockade on Gaza without mentioning that the blockade was in place "to stop the smuggling of weapons and rockets used to target Israeli citizens". NGO Monitor continued and said that "UN Secretary General's Palmer Committee declared in September 2011 that the blockade is legal under international law."

 Amnesty "failed to mention the thousands of tons of goods provided by Israel to Gaza each week."

 NGO Monitor also pointed out that Amnesty's report "mentions Israel 137 times, while making only 74 mentions of the Syrian regime", during a year in which thousands of people have been killed by the Syrian government.

Amnesty allowed a speaking event to take place in London in May 2011, organized by the magazine Middle East Monitor Online (MEMO) and the Palestine Solidarity Campaign. Much controversy surrounded this event since one of the speakers included Abdel Bari Atwan, editor of the London-based al-Quds al-Arabi newspaper. In the past, Atwan has said that "he would 'dance with delight' in Trafalgar Square if Iran attacked Israel, and that the terrorist attack on the Mercaz HaRav yeshiva, in which eight students were killed, "was justified" as it was responsible for "hatching Israeli extremists and fundamentalists". Amnesty responded by saying that "while we did have concerns about the way the event had originally been organized, these have been resolved".

Amnesty also allowed a speaking event to take place in January 2012, which included a speaker who is viewed as anti-Israel. The UK's Zionist Federation said that the speaker "goes beyond the bounds of acceptable behavior" and asked that the event either not take place or that a pro-Israel speaker be allowed to attend as well. In addition, NGO Monitor's Gerald Steinberg said that the speaker's "intense hatred directed at Israel, which is the embodiment of Jewish sovereign equality in the world, is entirely inconsistent with the universal values that Amnesty claims to promote. If Amnesty seeks to restore its tarnished moral credentials, it must end this cooperation, and join in denouncing White's anti-Israel campaigns."

Some people have criticized Amnesty for promoting an unbalanced and excessive focus on Israel. The American Jewish Congress asserts that Amnesty's criticism of Israel distorts the law of war by "read[ing] the law of war as if it was a law banning war", and misinterprets the Geneva Conventions with regard to the issue of proportionality in war. Yael Beck and Merav Fima of NGO Monitor, a Pro-Israel NGO, claim the Amnesty has an "obsession with Israel" and "persistently condemns Israel while ignoring suffering elsewhere".

Alan Dershowitz, professor of law at Harvard University, in his book The Case for Israel, is very critical of Amnesty and their comparison of Israel to nations such as Sudan and other human rights offenders. Amnesty International has consistently called on Israel to bring any officer suspected of human rights violations to justice and to remove its settlements in the West Bank. It has also opposed "discrimination" against Arab citizens of Israel, and says that the Law of Return and Citizenship and Entry into Israel Law are discriminatory, as they grant automatic citizenship to Jews worldwide, while denying Palestinian refugees the right of return. It has also opposed the blockade of the Gaza Strip, calling it "collective punishment".

In 2010 Frank Johansson, the chairman of Amnesty International-Finland called Israel a nilkkimaa, a derogatory term variously translated as "scum state", "creep state" or "punk state". Johansson stood by his statement, saying that it was based on Israel's "repeated flouting of international law", and his own personal experiences with Israelis. When asked by a journalist if any other country on earth that could be described in these terms, he said that he could not think of any, although some individual "Russian officials" could be so described. According to Israeli professor Gerald M. Steinberg of NGO Monitor: "Amnesty International has promoted an intense anti-Israel ideology, resulting in statements like these."

In November 2012, Amnesty UK began a disciplinary process against staffer Kristyan Benedict, Amnesty UK campaigns manager, because of a posting on his Twitter account, said to be anti-semitic, regarding three Jewish members of parliament and Operation Pillar of Defense where he wrote: "Louise Ellman, Robert Halfon and Luciana Berger walk into a bar ... each orders a round of B52s ... #Gaza". Amnesty International UK said "the matter has been referred to our internal and confidential processes." Amnesty's campaigns director Tim Hancock said, "We do not believe that humour is appropriate in the current circumstances, particularly from our own members of staff." An Amnesty International UK spokesperson later said the charity had decided that "the tweet in question was ill-advised and had the potential to be offensive and inflammatory but was not racist or antisemitic."

In April 2015, Amnesty International voted against a motion proposing that it fight against antisemitism in the UK, which reached then-record levels in the previous year; despite its extensive attention to the single issue of Islamophobia in earlier years, Amnesty stated that it would be inappropriate to campaign for an issue with a "single focus" and that Amnesty "fights against discrimination in all its forms."

In November 2016, Amnesty International conducted a second internal investigation of Benedict for comparing Israel to the Islamic state.

In April 2021, Amnesty International distanced itself from a tweet written in 2013 by its new Secretary General, Agnes Callamard, which read: "“NYT Interview of Shimon Perres [sic] where he admits that Yasser Arafat was murdered"; Amnesty responded by saying: “The tweet was written in haste and is incorrect. It does not reflect the position of Amnesty International or Agnès Callamard.” Callamard herself has not deleted the tweet.

On March 11, 2022, Paul O'Brien, the Amnesty International USA Director stated at a private event: "We are opposed to the idea — and this, I think, is an existential part of the debate — that Israel should be preserved as a state for the Jewish people", while adding "Amnesty takes no political views on any question, including the right of the State of Israel to survive." He also rejected a poll that found 8 in 10 American Jews were pro-Israel, saying: "“I believe my gut tells me that what Jewish people in this country want is to know that there’s a sanctuary that is a safe and sustainable place that the Jews, the Jewish people can call home.” On March 14, 2022, all 25 Jewish Democrats in the House of Representatives issued a rare joint statement rebuking O'Brien, saying that he "has added his name to the list of those who, across centuries, have tried to deny and usurp the Jewish people’s independent agency" and "condemning this and any antisemitic attempt to deny the Jewish people control of their own destiny." On March 25, 2022, O'Brien wrote to the Jewish congressmen: "I regret representing the views of the Jewish people."

Alleged ties to Muslim Brotherhood and Islamists 
In August 2015, The Times reported that Yasmin Hussein, then Amnesty's director of faith and human rights and previously its head of international advocacy and a prominent representative at the United Nations, had "undeclared private links to men alleged to be key players in a secretive network of global Islamists", including the Muslim Brotherhood and Hamas. Ms. Hussein's husband, Wael Musabbeh and a Bradford community trust, of which both Mr Musabbeh and Ms Hussein were directors, were alleged by the United Arab Emirates to be part of a financial and ideological network linking the Muslim Brotherhood to its affiliate in the UAE, which the UAE government in 2013 accused of trying to overthrow the government. Amnesty said it knew in 2013 of the alleged links between the Muslim Brotherhood, Mr Musabbeh, and the Bradford trust, but did not realize there was any connection to Ms Hussein, Musabbeh's wife of 20 years; it also challenged the fairness of the trial. Mr Musabbeh said he had no connection to the Muslim Brotherhood and was not an Islamist.

The Times also detailed instances where Hussein was alleged to have had inappropriately close relationships with the al-Qazzaz family, members of which were high-ranking government ministers in the administration of Mohammed Morsi and Muslim Brotherhood leaders at the time. In 2012, Amnesty staff alerted authorities in the organization after Ms Hussein held a private, unofficial meeting in Egypt with Adly al-Qazzaz, a ministerial education adviser blamed by a teachers’ union for undertaking the “Brotherhoodisation” of Egypt’s education system; shared an evening meal with his family; and stayed overnight in their home. Amnesty International's policies strictly forbid it from siding with any government or political party, and Amnesty staff are asked to declare  links that may produce a real or perceived conflict of interest with its independence and impartiality. Amnesty International said that conducted an internal inquiry and told Ms Hussein told that her overnight stay with the al-Qazzaz family was inappropriate. Ms Hussein apologized and denied supporting the Muslim Brotherhood, saying that “any connections are purely circumstantial”.

Syrian government's denial of Amnesty's findings on Sednaya Prison
In February 2017, Amnesty International reported that between 5,000 and 13,000 prisoners had been tortured to death by the Syrian government at the Sednaya Prison between 2011 and 2016, describing it as a "Human Slaughterhouse", a claim that has been strenuously denied by the Syrian Government who described the allegations as "false" and part of a wider smear campaign against the Government.

Iranian government's protest of Amnesty's claims about the death toll in the 2019 fuel protests in Iran
On 19 November 2019, Amnesty International reported that at least 106 civilians had been "unlawfully killed" by Iranian security forces during the 2019 Iranian protests which were triggered by outrage over a sudden increase in gasoline prices. Amnesty later revised the figure upwards to 304, claiming that unarmed protesters had been deliberately massacred by the authorities who had "green lighted" a brutal crackdown to suppress dissent. The Iranian authorities, whilst acknowledging that some armed rioters had been shot by police, rejected Amnesty's figure as "sheer lies" and part of a "disinformation campaign waged against Iran from outside the country".

Judiciary spokesman, Gholamhussein Esmayeeli, countered that it was armed rioters who had actually killed many people, but that Amnesty and other organizations had nonetheless, "named people who have died in other incidents that are different from the recent riots and many of those people claimed to be killed are alive". Secretary of Supreme National Security Council (SNSC), Rear Admiral Ali Shamkhani, also denied that civilian deaths were caused mostly by security forces and instead asserted that, "more than 85 percent of victims of the recent unrest in cities of Tehran province had not taken part in any of the protests.". In a thinly veiled rebuttal to Amnesty, Prosecutor-General Mohammad Montazeri retorted that, "people, who are outside the country, have no access to exact information and accurate figures. They provide different figures which are invalid." In its 16 December press release, Amnesty's research director for MENA, Philip Luther, moreover, did not acknowledge the widespread arson, vandalism and looting apparent during the protests/riots, that led to the forceful response, or the reported killing of security officers either. He also appeared to misquote supreme Leader, Ayatollah Khamenei, as stating that all those protesting in the streets were "villains". The Iranian leader had, in fact, distinguished between those peacefully objecting to the govermmemt policy and those who destroyed property: "Some people are no doubt worried by this decision (to raise the price of gasoline) ... but sabotage and arson is done by villains, not our people." Ayatollah Khamenei further elaborated that those killed in any crossfire between the security forces and armed rioters/saboteurs were to be regarded as "martyrs".

On 20 May 2020, Amnesty published a final report on the protests where, for the first time, it named 232 out of the 304 alleged victims. Amnesty also acknowledged that many of those killed were bystanders who were not even protesting at the time of their death. The report was itself heavily criticized by two independent analysts who accused Amnesty of distorting many facts, making unsupported claims and ignoring key evidence. On 1 June 2020, an Iranian lawmaker, Mojtaba Zolnour, made it known that 230 persons had been killed, including 6 security officers and 40 from the Baseej volunteer force. More than a quarter were bystanders who he alleged were killed by rioters.

2019 report on workplace bullying within Amnesty International
In February 2019, Amnesty International's management team offered to resign. The offer came after an independent report by Konterra group found what it called a "toxic culture" of workplace bullying, as well as numerous evidences of bullying, harassment, sexism and racism. The report was commissioned by Amnesty after the investigation of the suicides of 30-year Amnesty veteran Gaëtan Mootoo in Paris in May 2018 (who left a note citing work pressures), and 28-year-old intern Rosalind McGregor in Geneva in July 2018. The Konterra report found that: "39 per cent of Amnesty International staff reported that they developed mental or physical health issues as the direct result of working at Amnesty". The report concluded, "organisational culture and management failures are the root cause of most staff wellbeing issues.".

The report said that efforts by Amnesty to address its problems had been "ad hoc, reactive, and inconsistent," and that staff described the senior leadership team as out-of-touch, incompetent and callous. Those signing a letter offering to resign were the senior directors of research, the Secretary General's office, global fundraising, global operations, people and services, law and policy and campaigns and communications. However, Amnesty International's Secretary General Kumi Naidoo did not accept resignations and instead offered generous redundancies to managers concerned, including to Mootoo's senior director Anna Neistat directly implicated in the report on Mootoo's death. Naidoo stated that his priority was "to rebuild trust at a dangerous time when Amnesty was needed more than ever".

After none of the managers were held accountable, a group of workers petitioned for Amnesty's chief to resign. On 5 December 2019 Naidoo resigned from his post of Amnesty's Secretary General, citing ill health. Julie Verhaar was appointed as interim Secretary General the same day.

2019 budgetary crisis controversy

In 2019 Amnesty International's Secretary General Kumi Naidoo admitted to a hole in the organization's budget of up to £17m in donor money to the end of 2020. In order to deal with the budgetary crisis Naidoo announced to staff that the organization's headquarters would have cut almost 100 jobs as a part of urgent restructuring. Unite the Union, the UK's biggest trade union, said the redundancies were a direct result of "overspending by the organisation's senior leadership team" and have occurred "despite an increase in income". Unite, which represents Amnesty's staff, feared that cuts would fall heaviest on lower income staff. It said that in the previous year the top 23 highest earners at Amnesty International were paid a total of £2.6m – an average of £113,000 per year. Unite demanded a review of whether it is necessary to have so many managers in the organisation.

2020 secret payout controversy

In September 2020 The Times reported that Amnesty International paid £800,000 in compensation over the workplace suicide of Gaëtan Mootoo and demanded his family keep the deal secret. The pre-trial agreement between London-based Amnesty's International Secretariat and Motoo's wife was reached on the condition that she keeps the deal secret by signing NDA. This was done particularly to prevent discussing the settlement with the press or on social media. The arrangement led to criticism on social media, with people asking why an organisation such as Amnesty would condone the use of non-disclosure agreements. Shaista Aziz, co-founder of the feminist advocacy group NGO Safe Space, questioned on Twitter why the "world's leading human rights organisation" was employing such contracts. The source of the money was unknown. Amnesty stated that the payout to Motoo's family "will not be made from donations or membership fees".

India 
On 29 September 2020, the Indian offshoot of Amnesty International released a statement announcing suspension of its operations in the country after the Enforcement Directorate, which investigates financial crimes and irregularities in India, ordered the freezing of its bank accounts. In a statement, the Indian Ministry of Home Affairs said that Amnesty had contravened Indian laws by receiving funds from abroad. Amnesty, which said it had been harassed by the Indian government for its actions on human rights, particularly for its call for accountability in the Indian state of Kashmir, denied the charges and stated that it would appeal in Indian courts.

Earlier, in 2009, Amnesty's Indian offshoot suspended its India operations as the UPA government rejected its application for receiving foreign funding.

Alexei Navalny 
On February 24, 2021, Amnesty announced that it would strip Alexei Navalny of his status as a prisoner of conscience on account of comments he had made about migrants in 2007 and 2008. Amnesty said that the statements by Navalny, who had been poisoned by Novichok in 2020 and imprisoned by Russia in February 2021, could amount to incitement to discrimination, violence or hostility, met the level of "hate speech", and were thus incompatible with the label "prisoner of conscience".

Amnesty's decision was met by sharp criticism from supporters, British parliamentarians, and other opposition figures in Russia. Critics noted that many of the original complaints that led Amnesty to rescind its designation had cited material that originated with a Twitter account that appeared to be linked to the Russian state, and Amnesty's Russia media manager asserted that there appeared to be a coordinated campaign by pro-Kremlin forces to discredit Navalny; in celebrating the decision, the head of Russia’s state-funded TV network RT, Margarita Simonyan, referred to the source of the original allegations against Navalny as "our columnist." The decision appeared to have been made by Amnesty's London Headquarters without the consultation of its Moscow brach; on February 27, 2021, Julie Vahaar, Amnesty’s secretary-general, announced an internal inquiry into the process by which Amnesty had redesginated Navalny, saying that Amnesty had been targeted by a “Russian government smear campaign.” In a private Zoom call with pro-Russian pranksters posing as Navalny's associates, members of Amnesty's leadership, including Vahaar, admitted that the move had "done a lot of damage."

On May 7, 2021, Amnesty redesignated Navalny as a Prisoner of Conscience and apologized, saying they had "made a wrong decision" and apologizing personally to Navalny "and the activists in Russia and around the world who tirelessly campaign for his freedom" for the negative impacts their decision had had; Amnesty also observed that their actions had been used to "further violate Navalny's rights." They also clarified that in redesignating Navalny a POC, Amnesty was not implying any endorsement of his past comments, which it found "reprehensible." Leonid Volkov, Navalny’s chief of staff, responded on Twitter that “the ability to recognize mistakes and move on is the most important thing that distinguishes normal people from Putins [sic]”. Amnesty also stated that it would reconsider the process by which it designated individuals as Prisoners of Conscience.

2022 Russian invasion of Ukraine

Dissolution by the Russian government 
In early March 2022, during the 2022 Russian invasion of Ukraine, Roskomnadzor blocked the Russian-language website of Amnesty International. In early April 2022, the Russian Ministry of Justice announced that it would forcibly shut down the Russian branch of Amnesty International, saying that the organisation had committed "violations of the current legislation of the Russian Federation."

Report on placement of Ukrainian forces in civilian areas 
On 4 August 2022, Amnesty International published a report saying that it had found evidence that the Armed Forces of Ukraine had based forces and weapons in residential areas on several occasions when there were viable alternatives nearby. Amnesty further stated that while these cases did not justify Russian attacks on civilians, and that in a number of cases they had investigated  Ukrainian forces had not acted similarly, these tactics risked endangering civilians. The Amnesty report followed a report from the Office of the UN High Commissioner for Human Rights in June that had warned that both Russian and Ukrainian forces had established themselves "either in residential areas or near civilian objects, from where they launched military operations without taking measures for the protection of civilians present, as required under international humanitarian law" and a report from Human Rights Watch in July that said it had found evidence of three cases where "Ukrainian forces based forces among homes where people were living but took no apparent action to move residents to safer areas" and four cases of Russian forces doing the same.

The Amnesty report sparked significant outrage in Ukraine and Western countries. Ukrainian President Volodymyr Zelenskyy accused Amnesty of trying to "amnesty the terrorist state and shift the responsibility from the aggressor to the victim", while Ukrainian Minister of Foreign Affairs Dmytro Kuleba stated that the report creates "a false balance between the oppressor and the victim, between the country that is destroying hundreds and thousands of civilians, cities, territories and [a] country that is desperately defending itself". The report was praised by several Russian and pro-Russian figures, including the Russian embassy in London, causing further criticism against the organization. Following the publication of the report, Oksana Pokalchuk, head of Amnesty International in Ukraine, resigned from her post, left the organization and published an explanation in The Washington Post on 13 August. Amnesty International Sweden cofounder Per Wästberg also terminated his relationship with the organization in protest to the report. The Kyiv Independent editorial team strongly criticized the report, pointing out flaws in reasoning and stating that "Amnesty [International] could not properly articulate who the main perpetrator of violence in Ukraine was". An editorial published by The Times described Amnesty International as "Putin's propagandists", noting that the organization already has a "previous form in abasing itself before the Kremlin" by refusing to recognize Russian opposition leader Alexei Navalny as a prisoner of conscience, and stating that "Amnesty evidently learnt nothing from that fiasco”. Further criticism came from French philosopher Bernard-Henri Lévy and by Italian journalist Lorenzo Cremonesi. British conservative journalist Stephen Pollard wrote on The Daily Telegraph that Amnesty was "utterly morally bankrupt" and that it was driven by an "anti-Western obsession".

Amnesty's report was criticized by military and legal experts such as John Spencer, a specialist in urban warfare studies, who stated that advising Ukrainian forces not to be in urban areas did not make sense, as the circumstances of the war necessitated that. United Nations war crime investigator Marc Garlasco stated that the Amnesty report got the law wrong, and also that Ukraine was making efforts to protect civilians, including helping them to relocate.

Amnesty's Canadian branch issued a statement expressing regret for among other things the "insufficient context and legal analysis". On 12 August, Amnesty's German branch issued a statement apologizing for aspects of the report's release and its effect, saying that it would be examined through a process initiated at the international level to determine what went wrong, and condemning its instrumentalization by Russian authorities.

In mid-October 2022, the UN Independent International Commission of Inquiry on Ukraine released a report which included findings similar to the findings of Amnesty's report. The report stated that the Commission "documented that in areas controlled by Ukrainian armed forces, particularly during the first phase of the hostilities, on some occasions, there was also a lack of separation between armed forces and civilians, which placed civilians at risk."

See also
 Criticism of Human Rights Watch

References

Further reading 
 American Gulag at National Review Online, (27 May 2005). 
 Jonathan V. Last, Calling It Like They See It, The Weekly Standard, 3 April 2003.
 Nabeel Abraham, Torture, Anyone?, Lies of Our Times, May 1992, pp. 2–4. Claims AI and other groups are reticent in describing alleged torture on the part of Israel.

Amnesty International
Amnesty International